Stefan Fryc (10 August 1894 – 9 November 1943) was a Polish footballer who played as a defender. He competed in the men's tournament at the 1924 Summer Olympics. He was murdered by the SS during World War II in a mass execution held in the Warsaw Ghetto.

References

External links
 

1894 births
1943 deaths
Polish footballers
Poland international footballers
Olympic footballers of Poland
Footballers at the 1924 Summer Olympics
People from Kraków County
Association football defenders
People who died in the Warsaw Ghetto
Polish people executed by Nazi Germany
Polish civilians killed in World War II
MKS Cracovia (football) players